Bogle is a surname, and may refer to:

 Adam Bogle (1848–1915), British soldier
 Albert Bogle (born 1949), minister of the Church of Scotland
 America Waldo Bogle (1844–1903), American pioneer
 Andrew Cathcart Bogle (1829–1890), Scottish soldier
 Andrew Nisbet Bogle (1868–1957), Scottish minister
 Bob Bogle (1934–2009), American musician
 Christian Bogle (born 2001), American race car driver
 Dick Bogle (1930–2010), American journalist and politician
 Donald Bogle, American writer
 Eric Bogle (born 1944), Australian singer
 Evelyn Bogle, Jamaican cricketer
 George Bogle (diplomat) (1746–1781), Scottish diplomat and adventurer
 George Bogle of Daldowie (1701–1782), Scottish merchant
 James Bogle (born 1959), Australian director and screenwriter
 James Bogle (cricketer) (1893–1963), Australian cricketer
 Jayden Bogle (born 2000), English footballer
 Joanna Bogle, British broadcaster
 John C. Bogle (1929–2019), American businessman
 John Bogle (artist) (c. 1744 – 1803) Scottish painter
 Justin Bogle (born 1981), American chef
 Kathryn Hall Bogle (1906–2008), American social worker and activist
 Mike Bogle (born 1961) American musician
 Omar Bogle (born 1993), English footballer
 Paul Bogle (1822–1865), Jamaican preacher
 Paul Bogle (priest) (born 1957), Dean of Clonmacnoise in the Church of Ireland
 Phil Bogle (born 1979), American footballer
 Richard Arthur Bogle (1835–1904), American pioneer
 Robert Bogle (born 1943), Canadian politician
 Robert W. Bogle, American journalist
 Sandi Bogle, English television personality
 Sarah Bogle (1870–1932), American librarian
 Thomas A. Bogle Jr. (1890–1955), American football player and coach
 Warren Bogle (born 1946), American baseball player
 W. C. Fields (1880–1946), American comedian who used the pseudonym Charles Bogle

See also
 Bogle (dancer) (1964–2005), Jamaican dancer and choreographer
 Bogle (disambiguation)